April Snow (lit. "Outing" or "Going Out") is a 2005 South Korean romantic drama film co-written and directed by Hur Jin-ho, starring Bae Yong-joon and Son Ye-jin.

Plot
In-su and Seo-young meet in a hospital after their respective spouses were both seriously injured in an accident while traveling in the same car. This leads them to discover that their spouses had been having an affair. As In-su and Seo-young stay at the same motel near the hospital to care for their comatose partners, they grow closer while sharing their grief, anger and fear for their loved ones' recovery. Gradually, they find themselves falling in love with each other. But when In-su's wife Su-jin regains consciousness, she tells him that she regrets her past actions, forcing him to make a decision.

Cast 
 Bae Yong-joon as In-su
 Son Ye-jin as Seo-young
 Im Sang-hyo as Kang Su-jin
 Kim Kwang-il as Kwang-il
 Jeon Guk-hwan as Su-jin's father
 Yoo Seung-mok as Doctor
 Kim Se-dong as Insurance company employee
 Chun Dae-byung as Policeman
 Ryu Seung-soo as Yoon Kyung-ho
 Lee Young-hee as Kyung-ho's mother
 Leessang as themselves
 Loveholic as themselves
 Clazziquai as themselves

Production
Filming began on February 4, 2005 in the seaside town of Samcheok, Gangwon Province.

A four-hour live concert was held on April 24, 2005 at the open-air theater in Yonsei University; some scenes were included in the film.

April Snow wrapped shooting on June 18, 2005 in Gwangju, Gyeonggi Province.

Reception
The film grossed  in South Korea on 809,191 admissions.

April Snow was also released in 10 other Asian countries. Due mainly to actor Bae Yong-joon's Korean Wave popularity, it became a box office success in Japan, Philippines and China.

A director's cut with 30 minutes extra footage was released in Japan in 2006, which also did well commercially.

Son Ye-jin received a Best Actress nomination at the 2005 Blue Dragon Film Awards.

Awards and nominations

References

External links
 
 
 

2005 films
2005 romantic drama films
2000s Korean-language films
Films directed by Hur Jin-ho
South Korean romantic drama films
2000s South Korean films